Shannon William Hurn (born 4 September 1987) is an Australian rules footballer playing for the West Coast Eagles in the Australian Football League (AFL). From South Australia, he excelled at both cricket and football at junior level, and at one stage had a rookie contract with the South Australian Cricket Association (SACA). At West Coast, he debuted during the 2006 season, and has since played over 300 games for the club. Generally playing as a half-back flanker, Hurn has one of the most penetrating kicks in the AFL. He served as West Coast captain for five seasons.

Early life
Hurn hails from a sporting family; his father William played 135 games with Central District, and his grandfather Brian was a member of South Australia's 1963-64 Sheffield Shield-winning team. Hurn was born in Angaston, South Australia in the Barossa Valley and attended Angaston Primary and Nuriootpa High School. Hurn was heavily involved in school and local sporting clubs, allowing him to excel in his favourite sports: cricket and Australian rules football.

Hurn’s more professional career began whilst playing his two favourite sports simultaneously. He took on a rookie contract with SACA (South Australian Cricket Association) in 2004, turning down a second one in 2005 to focus on his football. Hurn played football for Central District, making it to two premierships in 2004 and 2005. In 2005, Hurn was picked to captain the U-18 South Australian side and also picked in the U-18 All-Australian selection in football.

Hurn was picked 13th in the first round in the 2005 draft to West Coast Eagles.

AFL career 
After playing 6 games in his debut season he solidified his spot in the team, playing every game in 2007. He was nominated for the 2007 AFL Rising Star for his 19 possession performance in round 11 against .

Hurn played just six games in 2008 because of injury, in what was a poor year for the Eagles, but he rebounded to play 22 games in 2009, and 15 in 2010. In 2011, he truly established himself as an elite kick and a highly damaging player off of the half back line. He was crucial to the Eagles' success, as they rebounded from the wooden spoon the previous year to a top-four team the next. Hurn played every game, including the three finals, including 15 disposals and a goal in the nail biting semi-final win over Carlton.

In 2012, Hurn continued his strong form, playing all 24 games, including an 18 disposal and one goal effort in the Elimination Final demolition of North Melbourne. West Coast missed the finals in 2013, their lack of penetration out of the half-back line noticeable as Hurn played only 12 games.

After Darren Glass retired midway through the 2014 season, Hurn was named acting co-captain of the club for the remainder of the season, along with four other players.

On 8 December 2014 it was announced that Hurn would become the 10th captain of the West Coast Eagles.

Captaincy (2015-2019)
Hurn started out his captaincy with a highly successful first season in charge, leading West Coast to a grand final berth in 2015. The Eagles lost to Hawthorn by 46 points, with the Hawks becoming the first club since the Brisbane Lions in 2003 to win three consecutive premierships.

Over the next two years, Hurn continued to provide drive off halfback and through kick-ins. The club continued to reach the finals, but were defeated by the Western Bulldogs in an Elimination Final in 2016, and by Greater Western Sydney in a Semi Final in 2017.

In 2018, Hurn's form improved dramatically; in a change of role in defence, he established himself as one of the best defenders in the comp, earning a maiden All-Australian selection on the halfback flank. This coincided with a remarkable rise for West Coast, with the club expected to fall after losing a substantial amount of experience in the offseason. They made the Grand Final for the first time in three years, facing and defeating Collingwood by five points, with Hurn becoming the third premiership captain in the club's history. He and Mark LeCras were the only players from the Eagles' 2006 playing list to feature in the 2018 Grand Final, although neither he nor LeCras were selected for the 2006 Grand Final.

He continued his strong form into 2019, finishing with a second consecutive All-Australian selection, where he was named as Vice-Captain. He stepped down as captain following the 2019 season, to be replaced by Luke Shuey.

Statistics
Statistics are correct to the end of the 2022 season

|-  
| scope="row" text-align:center | 2006
| 
| 25 || 6 || 1 || 3 || 40 || 20 || 60 || 18 || 6 || 0.2 || 0.5 || 6.7 || 3.3 || 10.0 || 3.0 || 1.0
|-
| scope="row" text-align:center | 2007
| 
| 25 || 24 || 11 || 7 || 171 || 158 || 329 || 72 || 53 || 0.5 || 0.3 || 7.1 || 6.6 || 13.7 || 3.0 || 2.2
|-  
| scope="row" text-align:center | 2008
| 
| 25 || 6 || 1 || 3 || 53 || 17 || 70 || 17 || 10 || 0.2 || 0.5 || 8.8 || 2.8 || 11.7 || 2.8 || 1.7
|-
| scope="row" text-align:center | 2009
| 
| 25 || 22 || 4 || 3 || 282 || 159 || 441 || 106 || 24 || 0.2 || 0.1 || 12.8 || 7.2 || 20.0 || 4.8 || 1.1
|-  
| scope="row" text-align:center | 2010
| 
| 25 || 15 || 4 || 5 || 203 || 31 || 234 || 66 || 30 || 0.3 || 0.3 || 13.5 || 2.1 || 15.6 || 4.4 || 2.0
|-
| scope="row" text-align:center | 2011
| 
| 25 || 25 || 5 || 3 || 343 || 109 || 452 || 114 || 44 || 0.2 || 0.1 || 13.7 || 4.4 || 18.1 || 4.6 || 1.8
|-  
| scope="row" text-align:center | 2012
| 
| 25 || 24 || 12 || 7 || 339 || 76 || 415 || 119 || 57 || 0.5 || 0.3 || 14.1 || 3.2 || 17.3 || 5.0 || 2.4
|-
| scope="row" text-align:center | 2013
| 
| 25 || 12 || 1 || 2 || 160 || 27 || 187 || 47 || 26 || 0.1 || 0.2 || 13.3 || 2.3 || 15.6 || 3.9 || 2.2
|-  
| scope="row" text-align:center | 2014
| 
| 25 || 18 || 4 || 3 || 250 || 83 || 333 || 106 || 45 || 0.2 || 0.2 || 13.9 || 4.6 || 18.5 || 5.9 || 2.5
|-
| scope="row" text-align:center | 2015
| 
| 25 || 25 || 3 || 9 || 297 || 114 || 411 || 109 || 42 || 0.1 || 0.4 || 11.9 || 4.6 || 16.4 || 4.4 || 1.7
|-  
| scope="row" text-align:center | 2016
| 
| 25 || 23 || 3 || 1 || 300 || 113 || 413 || 111 || 40 || 0.1 || 0.0 || 13.0 || 4.9 || 18.0 || 4.8 || 1.7
|-
| scope="row" text-align:center | 2017
| 
| 25 || 23 || 0 || 2 || 292 || 165 || 457 || 145 || 44 || 0.0 || 0.1 || 12.7 || 7.2 || 19.9 || 6.3 || 1.9
|-  
| scope=row bgcolor=F0E68C | 2018#
|style="text-align:center;"| 
| 25 || 25 || 1 || 2 || 430 || 101 || 531 || 196 || 44 || 0.0 || 0.1 || 17.2 || 4.0 || 21.2 || 7.8 || 1.8
|-
| scope="row" text-align:center | 2019
| 
| 25 || 21 || 0 || 2 || 386 || 104 || 490 || 154 || 31 || 0.0 || 0.1 || 18.4 || 5.0 || 23.3 || 7.3 || 1.5
|- 
! scope="row" style="text-align:center" | 2020
|
| 25 || 17 || 0 || 0 || 205 || 66 || 271 || 87 || 26 || 0.0 || 0.0 || 12.1 || 3.9 || 15.9 || 5.1 || 1.5
|-
| scope="row" text-align:center | 2021
| 
| 25 || 15 || 0 || 0 || 260 || 67 || 327 || 103 || 24 || 0.0 || 0.0 || 17.3 || 4.5 || 21.8 || 6.9 || 1.6
|-
| scope="row" text-align:center | 2022
| 
| 25 || 19 || 0 || 0 || 356 || 80 || 436 || 143 || 33 || 0.0 || 0.0 || 18.7 || 4.2 || 23.0 || 7.5 || 1.7
|- style="background:#EAEAEA; font-weight:bold; width:2em"
| scope="row" text-align:center class="sortbottom" colspan=3 | Career
| 320
| 50
| 52
| 4367
| 1490
| 5857
| 1713
| 579
| 0.2
| 0.2
| 13.7
| 4.7
| 18.3
| 5.4
| 1.8
|}

Notes

References

External links

 
 
 

1987 births
Australian rules footballers from South Australia
Central District Football Club players
Living people
Peel Thunder Football Club players
West Coast Eagles players
West Coast Eagles Premiership players
People from Angaston, South Australia
All-Australians (AFL)
One-time VFL/AFL Premiership players